Mariano Díaz Mejía (born 1 August 1993), known as Mariano, is a professional footballer who plays as a striker for La Liga club Real Madrid.

Shortly after making his debut for Badalona in 2011, Mariano joined Real Madrid, where he played in the C-team and then the reserves, where he was top scorer in the 2015–16 Segunda División B. He then began playing with the first team, and was part of their squad that won La Liga, the UEFA Champions League and the FIFA Club World Cup in 2016–17. He was subsequently signed by Ligue 1 club Olympique Lyonnais but returned to Madrid one year later.

Mariano was born in Spain to a Spanish father and a mother from the Dominican Republic. He played and scored in a friendly match for the Dominican Republic national team in 2013. He then retired from the Dominican Republic team in the hopes of representing Spain.

Club career

Early career
Born in Premià de Mar, Barcelona, Spain, Mariano began his youth career with local side RCD Espanyol, and appeared for lowly CE Premià and Fundació Sánchez Llibre. In 2009, he joined CF Badalona, and made his senior debut on 21 August 2011, replacing Iñaki Goikoetxea for the final 21 minutes of a 1–0 loss at CD Teruel in the Segunda División B season; he made two more appearances off the bench. On the 31st, he made his first start, playing the entirety of a 3–1 loss at RB Linense in the season's Copa del Rey, scoring his team's consolation.

Real Madrid

Youth and Castilla
Shortly after, Mariano signed with Real Madrid, returning to youth football. In August 2012 he was promoted to the Madrilenian side's C-team also in the third level. He became a regular in his second season there, scoring 15 goals in 26 matches, including a hat-trick on 22 December 2013 in a 5–2 home win over Sestao River Club. The following 18 January, Mariano made his professional debut at the Estadio Alfredo Di Stéfano, appearing with the reserves in a 1–2 loss against Sporting de Gijón in the Segunda División; he came on for the final five minutes in place of Raúl de Tomás.

In 2014–15, with Castilla now in the third tier, Mariano was indefinitely promoted to the team. He made ten appearances, six from the bench, and scored five times. On 29 March, he entered late in De Tomás' place again and scored twice to cap a 5–1 home win over UD Las Palmas B, while one week later, he was given a start at lowly UB Conquense and struck both goals in a seven-minute span. On 24 October 2015, Mariano scored all of his team's goals in a 3–1 home win over UD Socuéllamos, and repeated this on 8 November in a 3–2 win against CF Fuenlabrada. The following 17 April, he scored his third treble of the season, scoring all of the goals – two penalties – in a home win over SD Gernika Club which put Castilla top. He scored his 25th goal of the season in a 6–1 win over La Roda CF on the last day of the season, making him the season's top scorer and winning the group at the expense of Barakaldo CF.

2016–17: Entrance in the first squad
Mariano was definitively promoted to the main squad by manager Zinedine Zidane on 20 August 2016, after a back injury to striker Karim Benzema. One week later, Mariano made his senior debut during a 2–1 win over Celta de Vigo, replacing Álvaro Morata in the 77th minute. On 26 October, again from the bench, he scored his first goal for the Merengues to conclude a 7–1 win at Cultural y Deportiva Leonesa in the Copa del Rey. In the second leg, he added a hat-trick for a 13–2 aggregate win, including a 23rd-second goal that was his team's fastest goal in the competition. Mariano scored his first top-flight goal on 10 December, equalising in a 3–2 comeback victory at home to Deportivo de La Coruña. Later that month, he was part of the squad that won the 2016 FIFA Club World Cup in Japan, but did not appear in either of Real Madrid's matches. Mariano made eight appearances when Madrid won the 2016–17 La Liga. He was a back-up when Madrid won the 2016–17 UEFA Champions League.

Lyon
On 30 June 2017, Mariano signed for Olympique Lyonnais. The fee was reported as €8 million plus 35% interest on the capital gain of a potential future transfer. He made his debut on 5 August in the first match of the 2017–18 Ligue 1 season against Strasbourg, scoring twice in a 4–0 home win. He totalled 18 goals for the league season, forming a prolific attacking trio alongside Memphis Depay and Nabil Fekir (19 and 18 goals respectively).

Return to Real Madrid
On 29 August 2018, Real Madrid announced they had signed Mariano on a five-year contract. As Real Madrid owned 35% of his playing rights, the fee was reduced to €23 million. He was issued shirt number 7, previously worn by Cristiano Ronaldo. His second debut was on 19 September, coming on as a 73rd-minute substitute against Roma in the first fixture of the 2018–19 UEFA Champions League group stage, and he scored the last goal of a 3–0 victory with a curved shot from outside the penalty area. On 1 March 2020, after just one minute of coming off the bench during his first league appearance of the season, he doubled Real Madrid's lead in a 2–0 victory against FC Barcelona in the 90th minute. He made five appearances during the league season, as Real Madrid won the 2019–20 La Liga. In July 2020, Mariano tested positive for COVID-19.

International career
Mariano is eligible for the Dominican Republic through his mother, a native of San Juan de la Maguana. He made his international debut on 24 March 2013 in a friendly against neighbours Haiti, and scored the last goal of a 3–1 victory. He later retired from the national team to focus on his career at Real Madrid and also avoid being cap-tied with the Dominican Republic, in view of a possible call up for the Spain national team. In December 2017, Spain manager Julen Lopetegui said he was monitoring Mariano for a call-up.

Career statistics

Club

International
Scores and results list the Dominican Republic's goal tally first.

Honours
Real Madrid
La Liga: 2016–17, 2019–20, 2021–22
Supercopa de España: 2019–20
UEFA Champions League: 2016–17, 2021–22
UEFA Super Cup: 2022
FIFA Club World Cup: 2016, 2022

Notes

References

External links

 Real Madrid profile
 
 
 
 

1993 births
Living people
People from Premià de Mar
Sportspeople from the Province of Barcelona
Spanish footballers
Footballers from Catalonia
Citizens of the Dominican Republic through descent
Dominican Republic footballers
Dominican Republic international footballers
Spanish people of Dominican Republic descent
Sportspeople of Dominican Republic descent
Dominican Republic people of Spanish descent
Association football forwards
CF Badalona players
Real Madrid C footballers
Real Madrid Castilla footballers
Real Madrid CF players
UEFA Champions League winning players
Olympique Lyonnais players
Ligue 1 players
La Liga players
Segunda División players
Segunda División B players
Dominican Republic expatriate footballers
Expatriate footballers in France
Spanish expatriate sportspeople in France
Dominican Republic expatriate sportspeople in France